Maureen O'Sullivan was an Irish actress.

Maureen O'Sullivan may also refer to:

Maureen O'Sullivan (politician) (born 1951), Irish independent politician
Maureen O'Sullivan (spy) (1918–1994), member of the Special Operations Executive 
Maureen Donovan O'Sullivan (1886–1966), historian
Maureen O'Sullivan (psychologist), see Wizards Project

See also
Maureen Sullivan (disambiguation)